Fonovka is a village in Petrovsky District of Tambov Oblast, Russia.

References

Rural localities in Tambov Oblast